Thomas Aeschi ( born 13 January 1979) is a Swiss businessman, politician and former banker. He currently serves as a member of the National Council (Switzerland) for the Swiss People's Party since 2011.

Early life and education 
Aeschi was primarily raised in Allenwinden, a municipality within Baar, Switzerland. In 1996, he completed an international exchange year at Lisle Senior High School in Lisle, Illinois a suburb of Chicago. He completed his education by earning a Type B Matura in 1998 and went to college at University of St. Gallen where he completed a undergraduate degree in Economics (class of 2002). Aeschi also obtained a Master of Publication Administration from Harvard Kennedy School.

In 2004, he started his banking career in M&A at Credit Suisse in Zurich, where he stayed in various positions until 2006. He currently is Managing Partner of his independent consulting firm Aeschi & Company, LLC in Baar. He is currently on various boards such as Helvetische Bank in Zurich founded by Thomas Matter.

Political career 
His parliamentary career began in 2010 when he was elected to the Cantonal Council for a term of two years (2010-2012). He was elected to the National Council in 2011. In November 2015, The SVP parliamentary Group in the federal council presented Aeschi as its official candidate for the 2015 federal council election and in 2017 he became president of the SVP Parliamentary Group. From 2015 to 2021 he served as president of SVP Kanton Zug. In 2022, he made a racist comment against Nigerians calling them rapists. Apology was tendered on his behalf by a member of his parliamentary group.

References 

Living people
1979 births
Swiss businesspeople
Swiss politicians
University of St. Gallen alumni
Harvard Kennedy School alumni